Stefano Raise (8 August 1932 – 6 February 2008) was an Italian former footballer who played as a midfielder.

Club career 
Raise debuted with Hellas Verona in 1953 during their Serie B campaign. The following season Raise scored two goals in 11 games, before transferring to U.S. Catanzaro in the summer. Raise finished with a total of 3 goals in 21 games for Verona.

During his first season with Catanzaro, Raise scored 10 goals in 34 games of their 1956–66 campaign in Serie C. In his fourth season at Catanzaro, Raise helped the team secure promotion into Serie B. In the team's first season back in Serie B, Raise scored 1 goal in 37 matches. Raise continued to play for another 5 seasons with the Calabrian side and even went on to captain the team. Raise was apart the squad that reached the 1966 Coppa Italia Final. Catanzaro lost the final 2–1 against ACF Fiorentina in Rome, however Raise did not play. By the end of the 1956–66 campaign, Raise had spent 11 seasons with the club, 4 in Serie C and 7 in Serie B. His total record for Serie B with the club ended with 6 goals in 184 appearances. His total record for the club across all league games ended with 26 goals in 312 appearances.

Career statistics

Club 

Notes

Honours 
U.S. Catanzaro
 Serie C: 1958–59 (Girone B)

References  

1932 births
2008 deaths
Association football midfielders
Italian footballers
U.S. Catanzaro 1929 players
Hellas Verona F.C. players
Serie B players
Serie C players